Eupithecia chui is a moth in the family Geometridae. It is found in Taiwan.

References

Moths described in 1970
chui
Moths of Taiwan